Telefol is a language spoken by the Telefol people in Papua New Guinea, notable for possessing a base-27 numeral system.

History
The Iligimin people also spoke Telefol, but they were defeated by the Telefol proper.

Orthography

Single  and  represent both their single and long vowels, since they rarely contrast.

 is written  pre-consonantally and word-finally.

Got 'God'.

Phonology

Consonants

 and  only appear in a few particles and some exclamations.  and  only appear in a few loans.

Vowels

There are two contrastive phonemic tones in Telefol, high and low. For example, ùlín 'club' vs. úlìn 'planted'.

Also, single /e/ and /o/ don't occur in one-syllable words or in terminal syllables.

Vowel length only contrasts in initial syllables.

Phonotactics

 does not occur word-initially.

 is allowed in medial, but not word-initial, onsets.

Grammar
Telefol is a subject–object–verb language.

Verbal aspect
Telefol has a rich aspectual system. Telefol verbs have "punctiliar" (momentary/completed) and "continuative" stems.

Counting system
Telefol uses a base-27 counting system. This is mapped onto the body by counting each of the following: the left pinky to the left thumb (1-5); the wrist, lower arm, elbow, upper arm, and shoulder (6-10); the side of the neck, ear, and left eye (11-13); the nose (14); and similarly on the right side in reverse order, from the right eye to the right pinky (15-27).

Kinship
Telefol has dyadic kinship terms (terms referring to the relationship two or more people have to each other), which are uncommon in the world's languages and not prevalent in Papua New Guinea. However, they are a salient feature of the Ok languages. Related terms are found in Oksapmin, Mian, and Tifal.

Evolution

Below are some reflexes of proto-Trans-New Guinea proposed by Pawley (2012):

See also
Ok languages

References

Bibliography
 Telefol Organised Phonology Data. [Manuscript] http://www.sil.org/pacific/png/abstract.asp?id=333
 Healey, Alan. 1964. Telefol phonology. Linguistic Circle of Canberra Publications B, 3. Canberra: Australian National University. 53
 Healey, Alan. 1974. "A problem of Telefol verb classification." In Richard Loving (ed.), Studies in languages of the Ok family, 167–75. Workpapers in Papua New Guinea Languages, 7. Ukarumpa: Summer Institute of Linguistics. * Telefol Organised Phonology Data. [Manuscript] http://www.sil.org/pacific/png/abstract.asp?id=333

External links
Telefol on globalrecordings.net
WALS - Telefol
PNG Language Resources: Telefol information
Paradisec has a number of collections that include Telefol language materials.

Languages of Sandaun Province
Languages of Western Province (Papua New Guinea)
Ok languages